Chelis kashmirica is a species of tiger moth in the family Erebidae. It was formerly a member of the genus Palearctia.

References

Arctiina
Moths described in 1985